"When You're Smiling" is a popular song written by Larry Shay, Mark Fisher and Joe Goodwin. First published in 1928, it bears resemblance to the Spanish Canción "Amapola" by José María Lacalle García.  Early popular recordings were by Seger Ellis (1928), Louis Armstrong (1929), and Ted Wallace & His Campus Boys (1930).

Other notable recordings

Andy Williams released a version on his 1963 album, Days of Wine and Roses and Other TV Requests.
Bob and Alf Pearson in 1930 for Piccadilly Records
Caroline Henderson for her album No.8 (2008).
Cliff Bruner's Texas Wanderers – recorded September 13, 1938, it reached the country charts in 1939. This version was sung by singer pianist Moon Mullican.
Dean Martin (1952). Later, he sometimes parodied it as "When You're Drinkin'".
Doris Day – for her album What Every Girl Should Know (1960)
Dr. John – for his album Ske-Dat-De-Dat: The Spirit of Satch (2014)
Duke Ellington – several recordings in 1930.
Ella Fitzgerald – acc. by Lou Levy (p), Max Bennett (sb), Gus Johnson (dm) live Teatro Sistina, Rome, Italy — Ella in Rome: The Birthday Concert (1958)
Erroll Garner – in his album Piano Moods (1950).
Fats Domino – recorded in September 1967; included in his album Fats (1971).
Frank Sinatra – Sing and Dance with Frank Sinatra (1950) and also for his album Sinatra's Swingin' Session!!! (1961). Sinatra also sang the song in the film Meet Danny Wilson (1952).
Frankie Laine – performed the song in the film When You're Smiling (1950).
Jack Hylton – recorded June 6, 1930.
Judy Garland performed the song at the Judy at Carnegie Hall concert in 1961.
Julia Lee – The Chronological Julia Lee 1947 (2005).
Louis Armstrong – Satchmo: A Musical Autobiography (1956). In his recording from 1929, Armstrong tried to adapt the "white" style of Guy Lombardo through the inclusion of an expansive saxophone section sound.
Louis Prima – The Call of the Wildest (1957).
Michael Bublé – for his album BaBalu (2001). 17 years later he re-recorded it for his album Love
Mickey Mouse (Bret Iwan) – The MousePack – Mickey and Friends Singing Standards (2022)
Nat Gonella and His Trumpet — recorded November 15, 1932.
Nat King Cole – Ramblin' Rose (1962)
Patti Page – Page Two – Sings a Collection of Her Most Famous Songs (1957).
Perry Como – a single release, recorded November 25, 1947.
Rufus Wainwright recorded the song for his 2007 album Rufus Does Judy at Carnegie Hall
Teddy Wilson & His Orchestra, with Billie Holiday, recorded this song on January 6, 1938, in New York City for Brunswick/Columbia, with Teddy Wilson on piano, Benny Morton on trombone, Buck Clayton on trumpet, Lester Young on tenor sax, Freddie Green on guitar, Walter Page on bass and Jo Jones on drums.

In popular culture
 In "The Rock Vegas Story" episode of The Flintstones, first aired March 30, 1962, Barney and Betty Rubble perform the song
 At the start of each episode of The Comedians, first aired June 12, 1971, Shep's Banjo Boys are seen playing an instrumental version of this song, underscoring the opening credits.
 In the Seinfeld episode "The Jimmy", Mel Torme dedicates the song to Kramer.
 The song was sung by Rachel Berry (Lea Michele), a character on the television series Glee, in the episode "Mattress".
 The version recorded by Louis Armstrong was featured in an advertisement for Apple's new iPhone 4 in 2010.  It had previously appeared in a commercial for Kodak.
 The Louis Prima version is featured in the 2010 video game Mafia II on the fictional Empire Classic Radio station during the 1951 section of the game and also during the end credits. This version also appears in the movies Analyze This, directed by Harold Ramis, Anger Management, directed by Peter Segal, and  Find Me Guilty, directed by Sidney Lumet.
 In the Nickelodeon TV series The Backyardigans, the song's tune is used in an episode titled "It's Great to be a Ghost!".
 At the end of the 1995 Woody Allen movie Mighty Aphrodite the Greek chorus sings a version of this song.
 At the end of the Everybody Loves Raymond episode "Sweet Charity" (Season 7, Episode 16), Debra Barone (Patricia Heaton) sings the song in front of a group of unhappy hospital patients.
 At the end of the 2003 movie Windy City Heat the song is used over a montage of the main characters.
 Pablo Bubarre introduced "When You're Smiling" in one of the musical romance sketches of "Pablo the Romantic" from Boom Town, broadcast by BBC Three (UK, 2013). This version includes the piano music of Ross Leadbeater.
 The song is sung by Roberta Flack in the 1971 film $ ("Dollars").
 It was adopted by Leicester City F.C. as the club anthem and can be heard at many of the team's games.
 The Armstrong rendition features in the 2016 South Korean film The Age of Shadows as a juxtaposition to a violent montage unfolding.
 The song was used by Labatt's during the 1970s in commercials for Labatt's Blue beer, with the words "Blue smiles along with you" in place of "The whole world smiles along with you".
 Helena Bonham Carter (playing the role of Princess Margaret) sings this song in the second episode of Season 3 of The Crown.

See also
Montgomery-Ward bridge

References

1939 songs
Songs with music by Larry Shay
Louis Armstrong songs
Andy Williams songs
Football songs and chants
Pop standards
Songs written by Mark Fisher (songwriter)